Skärblacka IF is a Swedish football club located in Skärblacka.

Background
Skärblacka IF currently plays in Division 5 Östergötland Mellersta which is the sixth tier of Swedish football. They play their home matches at the Skärblacka IP in Skärblacka.

The club is affiliated to Östergötlands Fotbollförbund. Skärblacka IF played in the 2010 Svenska Cupen but lost 0–3 at home to Nyköpings BIS in the preliminary round.

Season to season

Footnotes

External links
 Skärblacka IF – Official website
 Skärblacka IF on Facebook

Sport in Östergötland County
Football clubs in Östergötland County
1910 establishments in Sweden